The 1993–94 Luxembourg Cup was the first playing of the Luxembourg Cup ice hockey tournament. Four teams participated in the tournament, which was won by Tornado Luxembourg.

Final standings

External links 
 Season on hockeyarchives.info

Luxembourg Cup
Luxembourg Cup (ice hockey) seasons